The 2013 CONCACAF Under-17 Women's Championship is the fourth edition of the U-17 women's championship in football for the CONCACAF region. The tournament was hosted by Jamaica from 30 October to 9 November 2013. The United States were the defending champions. All matches were played in Montego Bay.

The two finalists, alongside hosts Costa Rica, qualify for the 2014 FIFA U-17 Women's World Cup.

Qualified teams

The qualification process for the 2014 tournament started on 25 June 2013.

Squads

Group stage
All times are local (UTC-05:00).

Tie-breaking criteria
Teams were ranked on the following criteria:
 Greater number of points obtained in all group matches.
 Goal difference in all group matches.
 Greater number of goals scored in all group matches.
 Greater number of points obtained in group matches between the teams concerned.
 Drawing of lots.

Group A

Group B

Knockout stage
In the knockout stage, if a match is level at the end of normal playing time, penalty shoot-out is used to determine the winner (no extra time is played).

The winners of the two semifinal matches qualify for the 2014 FIFA U-17 Women's World Cup held in Costa Rica.

Semi-finals

Third place match

Final

Winners

Awards

References

External links
Under 17s – Women, CONCACAF.com

 
2013
Women's
2012
CON
2013 in American women's soccer
2013 in Canadian women's soccer
2013–14 in Mexican football
2013 in Haitian sport
2013–14 in Jamaican football
2013–14 in Salvadoran football
2013–14 in Trinidad and Tobago football
2013–14 in Guatemalan football
2013 in youth sport
2013 in youth association football